Hybomitra is a genus of horse flies in the family Tabanidae. There are at least 240 described species in Hybomitra.

See also
 List of Hybomitra species

References

Further reading

External links

 
 

Images representing Hybomitra 
Martin C. Harvey , 2018 Key to genus Hybomitra

Tabanidae
Brachycera genera
Taxa named by Günther Enderlein